The 2016 France Sevens was the fifth tournament within the 2015–16 World Rugby Women's Sevens Series. It was held over the weekend of 28–29 May 2016 at Stade Gabriel Montpied in Clermont-Ferrand, France.

Format
The teams were drawn into three pools of four teams each. Each team played everyone in their pool one time. The top two teams from each pool advanced to the Cup/Plate brackets while the top 2 third place teams will also compete in the Cup/Plate. The rest of the teams from each group went to the Bowl brackets.

Teams

Pool Stage

Pool A

Pool B

Pool C

Knockout stage

Bowl

Plate

Cup

References

External links
Official website

2016
2015–16 World Rugby Women's Sevens Series
2016 in French women's sport
June 2017 sports events in France
2016 in women's rugby union
2015–16 in French rugby union